Ariane Horbach (born 15 November 1993) is a German former professional racing cyclist. She rode for the Optum-Kelly Benefit Strategies team.

See also
 List of 2015 UCI Women's Teams and riders

References

External links

1993 births
Living people
German female cyclists
Place of birth missing (living people)
21st-century German women